Temple Bar Investment Trust is a large British investment trust dedicated to investments in UK securities. Established in 1926, the company is listed on the London Stock Exchange and is a constituent of the FTSE 250 Index. The chairman is Arthur Copple.

References

External links
  Official site

Financial services companies established in 1926
Investment trusts of the United Kingdom